The federal states of the German Empire were allowed to issue their own silver coins in denominations of 2 and 5 marks from 1873. The Coinage Act of 9 July 1873 regulated how the coins were to be designed: On the obverse or image side only the state sovereign or the coat of arms  of the free cities of Hamburg, Bremen or Lübeck was to be depicted, and the coin had to have a pearl circle. On the reverse or denomination side only the Imperial Eagle to a certain design was allowed. In addition, further silver coins were issued in denominations of 20 pfennigs, 50 pfennigs and 1 Mark. However, these were not stamped with a portrait of a ruler, since they were not issued by individual states.

In 1908, 3 Mark coins were minted for the first time, for which the same provisions applied as for the 2 and 5 Mark coins.

The provisions of 1873 were relaxed by the Coinage Act of 1 June 1909; other motifs could now also be depicted on commemorative coins, and the pearl circle was no longer mandatory; the value side was also allowed to have a different design.

Some coins were produced in very high numbers, such as the circulation and commemorative coins of the Kingdom of Prussia. In smaller territories with a correspondingly small population, on the other hand, there were significantly lower numbers especially of commemorative coins. Due to the First World War, on the other hand, only 100 examples were minted of the Saxon 3 Mark commemorative coin marking the 400th anniversary in 1917 and issues commemorating state anniversaries in Hesse (1917) and Bavaria (1918) were only minted in low numbers.

The coins were valid throughout the Empire, so that coins from Baden could also be used in Prussia, for example.

Mints 
The silver coins of the Empire were minted at nine different mints:

Denominations up to 1 Mark 
The smaller silver coins of the German Empire were issued from 1873 at nominal values of  20 Pfennig and 1 Mark. 50 Pfennig coins were struck by the mints from 1875. As early as 1877 the 20 Pfennig silver coins were replaced by those made of cupro-nickel. From 1891 the design changed slightly as it did also on the higher denominations: now the Imperial Eagle depicted a small coat of arms instead of the larger coat of arms used up to that point. After 1903 no more coins with the nominal value 50 Pfennig were struck; instead these coins bore the nominal value of ½ Mark.

They were produced in all the mints, although several did not produce all the denominations in every year.

These coins, like the 2, 3 and 5 Mark pieces, were made from 900/1000 silver.

Denominations from 2 Mark

Size and weight 
All coins were made of 900/1000 silver.

The 2 Mark coins are 11.111 grams in weight and have a diameter of 28 mm.

The 3 Mark coins are 16.667 grams in weight and have a diameter of 33 mm.

The 5 Mark coins are 27.778 grams in weight and have a diameter of 38 mm.

In general a Mark represented 5 grams of silver. A 5 Mark silver coin thus contained 25 g silver; by contrast there were also 5 Mark gold coins with a content of 1.79 g of gold.

Reverse side images 
The Imperial Eagle is depicted on the reverse of the silver coins. There are two variants: the eagle with a large coat of arms ("little eagle") and the eagle with a small coat of arms ("big eagle"). The former was used until 1889, the latter from 1891. No silver coins were minted in between those dates.

The inscription reads:

GERMAN EMPIRE --year--
--Value--

Exceptions 
The 1909 coinage allowed the value side to be changed as well:
 On the reverse of the coins "Centenary of the Grand Duchy 1915" (Mecklenburg-Schwerin) and "Centenary of the accession of the County of Mansfeld" (Prussia) another form of imperial eagle can be seen, the so-called "war eagle".
 The Prussian 3 Mark coins "Centenary of the University of Berlin" and "Centenary of the University of Breslau" also bear other forms of imperial eagle.
 A variation of the imperial eagle (Art Nouveau eagle) is embossed on the reverse of the “Centenary of the Grand Duchy of Saxe-Weimar-Eisenach” coin.
 The reverse of the coin "Centenary of the Wars of Liberation against France" features an eagle clutching a snake (a symbol of Napoleonic foreign rule).

Edge 
The edge of the 2 Mark coin is milled with 140 notches, while the perimeter of the 3 and 5 Mark coins are stamped with the inscription GOTT with UNS ("God with Us"). Between the words are two arabesques with an iron cross between them.

List 
The following is a table of the silver coins issued by the German Empire.

Legend:

Face Value: The face value of a coin is the denomination stated on the coin and at which the coins were most often issued.

Year of Issue: The year of issue is the year in which a particular coin was minted and issued.

Circulation/commemorative coin: A circulation coin is one without a specified reason for issue. It depicts only the portrait of the prince or the coat of arms of the city. In addition, it is usually issued over several years. A commemorative coin is one issued for a specific occasion, such as a state anniversary or the ruler's birthday. These coins were each only produced in one year. However, like the circulation coins, they were official means of payment.

Occasion/Motif: The occasion of a commemorative coin or the motif of a circulation coin is given here.

Mint: The coins were mostly only produced by one mint (see above) listed here.

Minted condition:
 MS: These coins were minted in the normal way. However, the majority are no longer in "mint uncirculated" condition, as they have worn out over time.
 PF: These coins were minted in a special way, separately from the others. They were minted from polished planchets using specially polished dies. This causes the bumps on the coin to appear dull while the surface is reflective. These coins are usually more expensive than the normal minted coins, as they were also minted in smaller numbers in most cases. If the word available is in the "PF" column, it means that the number of PF coins is not known.

Features

Embossing errors/deviations 
The following embossing variations are known:
 A stamping error on some coins is the incorrect marginal writing OTT with UNS, e.g. on some 3 Mark circulation coins in Anhalt from 1909 and some 5 Mark coins from Prussia with the image of William II.
 The 5 Mark coin of Württemberg from 1908 has the marginal writing OTT MI UNS on some coins.
 The word BADEN is written on some 5 Mark coins from Baden from 1875-1891 without a slash inside the A, i.e.: BΛDEN.
 In the case of the Baden 5 Mark circulation coins from 1913, it happens that the D in BADEN is open at the top.
 "Ottos Locken" on Bavaria's 5 and 2 mark coins from 1888 to 1913
 Open/closed forelock: Otto's originally closed forelock became an open forelock due to the polishing of the die.
 Curls above the ear: Due to stamping differences, there are either multiple curls or one large curl above the ear.
 2 and 5 Mark Saxe-Meiningen: The 2 and 5 Mark coins of Saxe-Meiningen have two different variants:
 The Duke's beard is approximately 1.5mm from the bead circle.
 The beard touches the beading.

Other features 

 Bremen originally wanted to mint a 3 Mark coin in 1914. However, the outbreak of the First World War prevented this.
 Mecklenburg-Schwerin had planned to mint 2 and 5 mark coins in 1919 for the 500th anniversary of the University of Rostock.

In Prussia, in 1915, a commemorative mint was planned for Bismarck's 100th birthday.

The fact that, due to high demand, the number of coins would have exceeded 100 million and thus been higher than the number for the Wars of Liberation coin or 25th anniversary of William II's reign (about 9 million), showed Bismarck's greater popularity over the Emperor, which is why the plan was dropped.

See also 
 List of commemorative coins of Germany
 Mark (1871)
 Reichsmark

References

Literature 
Basis of the article

 Jaeger, K. and H. Kahnt (2009). Die deutschen Münzen seit 1871. 21st edn., Regenstauf: Gietl, ISBN 978-3-86646-521-3.

Other sources

 MICHEL: Münzen-Katalog Deutschland 2009. Schwaneberger, Unterschleißheim 2009, ISBN 978-3-87858-589-3.
 P. Arnold, H. Küthmann, D. Steinhilber, D. Faßbender: Großer Deutscher Münzkatalog von 1800 bis heute. Gietl, Regenstauf 2008, ISBN 978-3-86646-035-5.
 H. Caspar: Der König rief, and alle, alle kamen: Ein Streifzug durch die Münzgeschichte des deutschen Kaiserreichs 1871 bis 1918. money trend Verlag, Wien 2009, ISBN 978-3-9502268-7-4.

External links 

!
!
Silver coins